The following is a list of notable people who have lived in Fayetteville, North Carolina.

A
 Dottie Alexander, former keyboardist for of Montreal
 Dwayne Allen, National Football League (NFL) tight end for New England Patriots
 Dominic A. Antonelli, former NASA astronaut
 Joey Arias, singer and performance artist
 Chris Armstrong, Canadian Football League (CFL) wide receiver
 Jason Armstrong, Ferguson Police Department (Missouri), Police Chief

B
 Charlie Baggett, NFL assistant coach
 Ellen S. Baker, physician and former NASA astronaut
 Velma Barfield, serial killer
 Garry Battle, professional arena football player
 Chip Beck, professional golfer, born in Fayetteville
 Ann Bilansky (c. 1820–1860), Fayetteville native hanged for murder
 Bunkie Blackburn, NASCAR driver
 Doug Brochu, actor, comedian, and producer
 David "Bubba" Brooks, jazz tenor saxophonist
 Harold Floyd "Tina" Brooks, jazz musician, tenor saxophonist, and composer
 Terry M. Brown Jr., attorney and politician
 Xavier Brunson, United States Army lieutenant general
 Jonathan Byrd, folk singer-songwriter

C
 John Benton Callis, politician and military officer
 Jeff Capel III, college basketball coach and former player
 Lanhee Chen, policy advisor, attorney, and academic
 Judy Clay, soul and gospel singer
 J. Cole, rapper and producer 
 Felisha Cooper, actress
 Clement Coward, United States Army major general
 Crystal Cox, track and field Olympian, gold medalist at 2004 Athens Summer Olympics
 Affion Crockett, actor, comedian, dancer, rapper and writer
 Aaron Curry, NFL linebacker
 Christopher Daniels, professional wrestler

D
 Elliott Daingerfield, artist
 Russell Davis, NFL defensive tackle
 Sandra Diaz-Twine, reality TV contestant
 James C. Dobbin, United States Secretary of the Navy, 1853–1857
 Ryan Dunson, rock musician (Rookie of the Year)

E
 Brad Edwards, NFL safety
 Kevin Elliott, football wide receiver
 Jane Evans Elliot (1820–1886), Civil War memoirist

F
 Beth Finch, first female mayor of Fayetteville (1975–1981)
 Cortland Finnegan, NFL Pro Bowl cornerback
 George Floyd, his murder led to widespread protests in the U.S. and around the world
 Raymond Floyd, golfer, Masters and U.S. Open champion
 Luis Fonseca, United States Navy Hospital Corpsman and veteran of Iraq War
 Todd Fuller, NBA player

G
 Blenda Gay, NFL player
 J. Harrison Ghee, actor, singer, and dancer known for work in musical theater
 Frank P. Graham, president of University of North Carolina and U.S. senator
 Moonlight Graham, Major League Baseball (MLB) outfielder for New York Giants
 Naomi Graham, middleweight boxer, first female active duty service member to compete for U.S. at Olympics

H
 Gary Hall Sr., swimmer, 3-time Olympic medalist
 Joe Harris, NFL linebacker
 Quanera Hayes, Olympic sprinter
 Brian Tyree Henry, actor
 Jimmy Herring, guitarist
 Sterling Hitchcock, MLB pitcher, 1998 NLCS MVP with San Diego Padres
 Kristina Holland, actress
 Chris Hondros, war photographer and 2004 Pulitzer Prize finalist
 Joe Horn, NFL wide receiver, 4-time Pro Bowl selection

J
 Martin Jarmond, college athletic director
 Michael Joiner, professional basketball player
 Walter B. Jones Sr., served in U.S. House of Representatives

K
 Aja Kim, singer and songwriter
 Lilliana Ketchman, dancer and YouTuber
 Cal Koonce, MLB pitcher, 1969 World Series champion with New York Mets

L
 Mary Sampson Patterson Leary Langston, abolitionist
 Roxie Collie Laybourne, ornithologist
 David R. Lewis, member of North Carolina House of Representatives
 Calvin Lowry, United Football League (UFL) safety for Omaha Nighthawks

M
 Elizabeth MacRae, actress
 Bernie Mangiboyat, rock musician (The Fifth)
 Eric Maynor, National Basketball Association (NBA) player
 Doug McDougald, NFL defensive end
 Everett McIver, NFL offensive guard
 Troy McLawhorn, musician, guitarist for Evanescence
 Jason "Mayhem" Miller, professional mixed martial arts fighter, hosted MTV's Bully Beatdown
 Dave Moody, Grammy-nominated artist, producer, songwriter, filmmaker
 Julianne Moore, Oscar-winning actress, born at Fort Bragg
 Kathryn Morgan, ballet dancer with New York City Ballet, born at Fort Bragg
 Morray, rapper and singer
 Marques Murrell, NFL linebacker

N
 Gene Nicholson, college football coach
 Xavier Nixon, offensive tackle for Washington Redskins

P
 Robert Martin Patterson, United States Army soldier and Medal of Honor recipient
 Shanaelle Petty, Miss Universe Croatia 2017
 Marshall Pitts Jr., first African-American Mayor of Fayetteville
 Marvin Powell, NFL offensive tackle, 3-time All-Pro, 5-time Pro Bowl selection

Q
 Mark Quander, United States Army brigadier general

R
 Shea Ralph,  assistant coach for University of Connecticut women's basketball team
 Jimmy Raye, former NFL wide receiver and coach
 Hiram Rhodes Revels, first African-American senator and member of Congress
 Jerry Richardson, first owner of NFL's Carolina Panthers

S
 Antwoine Sanders, NFL safety
 LaToya Sanders, WNBA player
 Terry Sanford, politician and educator
 Terrmel Sledge, professional baseball player
 Dennis Smith Jr., NBA player
 Charles Manly Stedman, U.S. congressman and Lieutenant Governor of North Carolina
 Robert Strange, United States senator
 Harry Sydney, NFL running back

T
 Moon Tae-jong, professional basketball player
 Kinnon Tatum, NFL player
 John Louis Taylor, jurist and first Chief Justice of the North Carolina Supreme Court
 Holden Thorp, served as tenth chancellor of University of North Carolina at Chapel Hill
 Tank Tyler, NFL defensive tackle

U
 Oli Udoh, NFL offensive guard
 Kelvin Underwood, drum set and taiko musician

W
Christopher Watts, convicted murderer who killed his wife and two daughters in Colorado in 2018
 Dennis L. A. White, actor
 Doug Wilkerson, NFL guard for San Diego Chargers, All-Pro and 3-time Pro Bowl selection
 Robert Wilkie, former Secretary of Veterans Affairs 
 C. J. Williams, professional basketball player in the Israeli Basketball Premier League
 Duvall Williams, former rear admiral in the United States Navy
 Gavin Williams, baseball player
 Jordan Williams, CFL linebacker, first overall pick of 2020 CFL Draft
 Seth Williams, CFL defensive back
 David Williston, first professionally trained African American landscape architect in U.S.
 Donnell Woolford, NFL cornerback, Pro Bowl selection

See also
 List of people from North Carolina

References

 
Fayetteville, North Carolina
Fayetteville